Yek Baghi (also Romanized as Yek Bāghī and Yak Bāghī) is a village in Lay Siyah Rural District, in the Central District of Nain County, Isfahan Province, Iran. At the 2006 census, its population was 12, in 4 families.

References 

Populated places in Nain County